Arthur C. Cope (June 27, 1909 – June 4, 1966) was an American organic chemist and member of the United States National Academy of Sciences.  He is credited with the development of several important chemical reactions which bear his name including the Cope elimination and the Cope rearrangement.

Cope was born on June 27, 1909, in Dunreith, Indiana.  He received a bachelor's degree in chemistry from Butler University in Indianapolis in 1929 and a PhD in 1932 from the University of Wisconsin–Madison.  His research continued at Harvard University in 1933 as a National Research Council Fellow.  In 1934, he joined the faculty of Bryn Mawr College.  There, his research included the first syntheses of a number of barbiturates including delvinyl sodium.  At Bryn Mawr, Cope also developed a reaction involving the thermal rearrangement of an allyl group which eventually became known as the Cope rearrangement.

In 1941, Cope moved to Columbia University where he worked on projects associated with the war effect including chemical warfare agents, antimalarial drugs, and treatments for mustard gas poisoning. In 1945, he moved to the Massachusetts Institute of Technology to become the head of the Department of Chemistry.

Awards and Honors
1944 American Chemical Society Award in Pure Chemistry
1945 Elected to the American Academy of Arts and Sciences
1947 Elected to the National Academy of Sciences.
1961 Elected to the American Philosophical Society

Today, the Arthur C. Cope Award, in honor of his memory, is given out annually by the American Chemical Society to the most outstanding organic chemist.

References

Literature

External links
National Academy of Sciences Biographical Memoir

1909 births
1966 deaths
Members of the United States National Academy of Sciences
Columbia University faculty
Organic chemists
20th-century American chemists
Butler University alumni
University of Wisconsin–Madison alumni
Harvard University staff
Bryn Mawr College faculty
Members of the American Philosophical Society